Hoang Thuc Hao (born in 1971) is the Vice President of the Vietnam Association of Architects. He graduated from the Faculty of Architecture and Planning, Hanoi University of Civil Engineering in 1992, and gained his graduate degree from Turin Polytechnic University in 2002. He is also a member of the Vietnam Green Architecture Council. In 2003, Hao established "1+1>2 Architects", an architecture firm that focuses on social architectural projects supporting disadvantaged communities and promoting cultural diversity in the context of rapid urbanisation.

Career 
Hoang Thuc Hao is the first Vietnamese architect to win the 2016 SIA-GETZ Award  for Outstanding Architect in Asia. He was also the first Vietnamese to be awarded The 2017 Vassilis Sgoutas Prize by the International Union of Architects (UIA) for architecture serving the most impoverished and for the conception of ingenious solutions for reducing poverty and indigence. "... Hoang Thuc Hao special attention to rural areas, poor communities, highlighting the role of the architect in the process of reconstruction, social innovation. He gets insights cultural and adaptive to local conditions and has pioneered innovations. People participate and are an integral part of the construction process, empowered to improve their living environment. Not only does he aim for sustainability in construction, more importantly, but he also respects and develops cultural values in his works - an aspect that is often neglected in developing economies."

His architecture seeks to provide practical solutions for marginalized communities in coping with climate changes, infrastructure lack and income precarity through a diverse range of projects such as community houses, workers' houses, schools for disadvantaged children, new rural villages, etc. With determination, combined with an amalgamation of academic training and vernacular knowledge, his works manifest an effective testament to the preservation and promotion of indigenous identities in contemporary social landscape.

Hao anchors his practice on his own philosophy of ‘architecture of happiness’, in which architecture does not only create spaces but also has the ability to facilitate social justice and contentment.

Works 
• Suoi Re Community House, Hoa Binh, Vietnam  

• Ta Phin Community House, Sa Pa, Lao Cai, Vietnam 

• Chieng Yen Community House, Lao Cai, Vietnam 

• Nam Dam Village, Ha Giang, Vietnam 

• Cam Thanh Community House, Hoi An, Vietnam 

• Lung Luong Primary School, Thai Nguyen, Vietnam 

• Bhutan Happiness Center 

• Playground system for children 

• Floodplain Housing Program

• Vegetable nursery system made of recycled materials - Bottle house

• Housing for Lao Cai workers

• Country house to the street, Dong Nai, Vietnam

• Dong Anh Villa

• Vinh Phuc Provincial Library. 

• An Binh meditation village, Yen Bai, Vietnam

• Hanging village, Dream Residence apartments.

• Oak Village, Myanmar

• Jackfruit Village, Son Tay, Hanoi  

• Mushroom Village, Y Ti, Lao Cai, Vietnam

• Center for elite craft villages and Bat Trang Pottery Museum

• Multipurpose Community Center, Lam Son, Thanh Hoa, Vietnam

• Hoi An Cultural Center and Trinh Cong Son Museum

• Phan Boi Chau School for the Gifted, Nghe An, Vietnam

• Institute of Advanced Mathematics, Hanoi

• National University's key research and experimentation institute

• Sentia School 

• Dewey International Intercollegiate School

• Tay Ho Tay International School 

• Da Hop Kindergarten and Primary School

Awards

References 

Vietnamese architects
Living people
1971 births